Týn nad Bečvou (until 1949 Týn) is a municipality and village in Přerov District in the Olomouc Region of the Czech Republic. It has about 800 inhabitants.

Sights

Týn nad Bečvou is known for the Helfštýn Castle.

References

Villages in Přerov District